Shekhawat is a clan of Rajputs found mainly in Shekhawati region of  Rajasthan. Shekhawats are descendants of Maharao Shekha of Amarsar. 
Shekhawat is the most prominent clan among Kachhwaha. The Shekhawati region was ruled by them for more than 500 years. Fought against mughals many time. Rao Sujjan Singh of  Chhapoli fought mughal army with 300 men to save temple.

Notable people

 Bhairon Singh Shekhawat  former Chief minister of Rajasthan and former Vice president of India.
Gajendra Singh Shekhawat the present Union Cabinet Minister in Ministry of Jal Shakti.
Piru Singh Shekhawat
Ajit Singh of Khetri of the Shekhawat clan helped the Swami Vivekanand by giving financial help
Brigadier Saurabh Singh Shekhawat

Legacy 
Shekahwats constructed many forts and temples, step well(bawdi) in Shekhawati region and patronized Hindu culture. There are more than 50 forts constructed by them. Shahpura, Alsisar, Bissau, Dundlod, Danta Ramgarh, Mahansar, Khetri, Mandawa, Nawalgarh, dalelgarhfort(baloda) Laxmangarh, Khandela Sikar, Jhunjhunu these are sites of some beautiful fort, temples and other architectural beauty work done under shekhawat rule in Shekhwati

References

Rajput clans of Rajasthan
Shekhawati